The sol was the currency of Bolivia between 1827 and 1864. There were no subdivisions of the sol but 16 soles were equal to 1 scudo. The sol replaced the Spanish colonial real at par and was replaced by the boliviano at a rate of 8 soles = 1 boliviano. Only coins were issued.

Coins
In 1827, silver , 1, 2, 4 and 8 soles were introduced. Silver  sol coins were issued in 1852 and 1853.

References

External links

History of Bolivian currency – Sol at currency-history.info

Currencies of Bolivia
Modern obsolete currencies